The British Youth Championships are cycling championships consisting of six rounds per year, of which each rider is allowed to drop their worst round. In 2017, there will be a 150cc championship, a 250cc championship, and a 500cc championship. There is a 125cc support championship as well, the winner of which is decided in one race.

Speedway competitions in the United Kingdom
Youth sport in the United Kingdom